The men's 100 metre breaststroke competition of the swimming events at the 1987 Pan American Games took place on 9 August at the Indiana University Natatorium. The last Pan American Games champion was Steve Lundquist of US.

This race consisted of two lengths of the pool, both lengths being in breaststroke.

Results
All times are in minutes and seconds.

Heats

Final 
The final was held on August 9.

References

Swimming at the 1987 Pan American Games